FxStat Group or FxStat, is an online social networking service in financial services headquartered in United Kingdom, London and the name FxStat comes from a combination of Forex and Statistics. FxStat was founded in April 2010 and focusing on the foreign exchange market, Stock market, and Commodity market. The focus was initially on social networking only, but later expanded to trading statement track record assessment, following successful traders portfolio, copying top performing traders, reading news, and sharing trades through a single platform to FxStat Group, Facebook, and Twitter.

In 2011, FxStat Group mixed social networking service  and Trade (financial instrument) nowadays called Social trading that allows  a real-time copy trading the top performing Trader (finance) automatically with full control and transparency. 
The site is available in 12 languages, including English, French, German, Spanish, Arabic, Chinese, Russian, Farsi, Italian, Portuguese, Dutch, and Urdu .

History 

FxStat Group (BVI) was founded in April 2010 by Sarmad Daneshmand and Bander Alweshaigri as a track record assessment and performance page provider for the traders under the name FX Stat (an abbreviation for Forex Statistics ). In 2013, expanded to Jordan and currently has offices in UK (London), Saudi Arabia (Riyadh), Jordan (Amman).
FX STAT Ltd UK is regulated and authorized by The Financial Conduct Authority (FCA).

Products and services

Social trading platforms 

In April 2011, FxStat launched its first social trading platform Tradebook, a paid service offering automatic real-time trading through signal providers. where started being used by FXCC, Cysec regulated broker  Cyprus Securities and Exchange Commission

Users can set their account to follow other member's trades and automatically execute them, becoming signal followers. In order to get FxStat's approval as signal providers, traders' accounts have to be proven real accounts and with a positive trading results history. These experienced investors are chosen by their followers using the analytics and performance comparison features. Users are still able to set their own trading rules while following a provider, like trading on a fixed lot, maximum open trades or maximum open orders, stop loss or maximum floating loss.

Later that year, in October 2011, FxStat launched Managed book platform. Managed book allows investors finding the best market leaders signal providers to copy automatically in real-time without paying per transaction commission. Instead, paying a success fee based on high water mark.  where Managed book started being used by Varengold Bank FX in Germany.
 
FxStat covers over 1,000 brokers worldwide. In July 2011, broker FXOpen announced the integration of FxStat Tradebook in its platform.

See also

References

External links 
 

Financial services companies established in 2010
Foreign exchange companies
British social networking websites
British companies established in 2010